Center for Cultural Studies may refer to:

Américo Paredes Center for Cultural Studies
Centre for Contemporary Cultural Studies (aka Birmingham Center for Cultural Studies)